Surat Thani Province Stadium is a football stadium in Surat Thani, Thailand.  It is the home stadium of Surat Thani F.C.  The stadium holds 10,000 spectators.

External links
Stadium information

Football venues in Thailand
Buildings and structures in Surat Thani
Buildings and structures in Surat Thani province